The Presidium of the 22nd Congress of the Communist Party of the Soviet Union (CPSU) was in session from 1961 to 1966. CPSU First Secretary Nikita Khrushchev chaired the Presidium from 1961 to 1964; Leonid Brezhnev succeeded him that year and chaired it until 1966. In contrast to full members, candidate members of the Presidium could not vote during Presidium sessions. It was normal that a full member of the Presidium had previously served as a candidate member, but this was not always the case. During the term 23 people held seats in the Presidium: 14 full members and 9 candidate members. One candidate member was promoted to full membership in the Presidium during the term. Not a single Presidium member died during this period while retaining office.

The Central Committee of the Communist Party of the Soviet Union was, according to sovietologists Merle Fainsod and Jerry F. Hough, elected unanimously at the 22nd Party Congress (17–31 October 1961). The 22nd Central Committee in turn elected the Politburo unanimously. Brezhnev, the  Chairman of the Presidium of the Supreme Soviet, was considered as an alternative to Kozlov as Second Secretary, but was instead made Third Secretary, the secretary responsible for industry. In 1963, for unknown reasons, possibly health reasons, Brezhnev took over Kozlov's duties at the Secretariat, and became the de facto Second Secretary. When a Western journalist asked Khrushchev in 1963 who would succeed him, Khrushchev responded bluntly "Brezhnev". After a prolonged power struggle, Khrushchev was ousted from power, and a collective leadership led by Brezhnev, Kosygin, Podgorny, Mikhail Suslov  and Andrei Kirilenko was formed.

In the months following Khrushchev's ousting, three members were elected to the Presidium: Alexander Shelepin, the Chairman of the State Control Commission; Petro Shelest, the First Secretary of the Communist Party of Ukraine; and Kirill Mazurov, a First Deputy Chairman of the Council of Ministers. While Brezhnev may have been General Secretary, he did not have a majority in the Presidium; when Kosygin and Podgorny agreed on policy, which was not often the case, Brezhnev found himself in the minority. Brezhnev could only count on three to four votes in the Presidium: Suslov, who often switched sides, Kirilenko, Pelše and Dmitry Polyansky. Brezhnev and Kosygin often disagreed on policy; Brezhnev was a conservative while Kosygin was a modest reformer. Kosygin, who had begun his premiership as Brezhnev's equal, lost much power and influence within the Presidium when he introduced the 1965–1971 Soviet economic reform.

Composition

Members

Candidates

References
General
Full- and candidate membership of the Presidium were taken from these sources:
  
  
Specific

Bibliography

 
 
 
 
 
 
 
 
 

Politburo of the Central Committee of the Communist Party of the Soviet Union members
Politburo
Politburo
Politburo
Politburo
Politburo
Politburo
Politburo
Politburo
Politburo